Live at Largo is the name of several live albums recorded at the Los Angeles nightclub Largo, including:

 Live at Largo, a 2003 album by Glen Phillips (singer)
 Live at Largo, a 2000 album by Steve Poltz
 Elliott Smith: Live at Largo, a CD accompanying the book Elliott Smith (book) by Autumn de Wilde
 The Interpreter: Live at Largo, a 2011 album by Rhett Miller

See also
 Largo (Brad Mehldau album), 2002
 Largo (disambiguation)